These 163 genera belong to the family Palaemonidae, palaemonid shrimps. At least 1,200 described species are placed in the Palaemonidae.

Palaemonidae genera

 Actinimenes Duriš & Horká, 2017
 Allopontonia Bruce, 1972
 Altopontonia Bruce, 1990
 Amphipontonia Bruce, 1991
 Anapontonia Bruce, 1966
 Anchiopontonia Bruce, 1992
 Anchistus Borradaile, 1898
 Ancylocaris Schenkel, 1902
 Ancylomenes Okuno & Bruce, 2010
 Anisomenaeus Bruce, 2010
 Apopontonia Bruce, 1976
 Arachnochium N.g.Wowor, 2010
 Araiopontonia Fujino & Miyake, 1970
 Ascidonia Fransen, 2002
 Balssia Kemp, 1922
 Bathymenes Kou, Li & Bruce, 2016
 Blepharocaris Mitsuhashi & Chan, 2007
 Brachycarpus Bate, 1888
 Brucecaris Marin & Chan, 2006
 Bruceonia Fransen, 2002
 Cainonia Bruce, 2005
 Calathaemon Bruce & Short, 1993
 Carinopontonia Bruce, 1988
 Chacella Bruce, 1986
 Climeniperaeus Bruce, 1995
 Colemonia Bruce, 2005
 Conchodytes Peters, 1852
 Coralliocaris Stimpson, 1860
 Coutierea Nobili, 1901
 Creaseria Holthuis, 1950
 Crinotonia Marin, 2006
 Cristimenes Duriš & Horká, 2017
 Cryphiops Dana, 1852
 Ctenopontonia Bruce, 1979
 Cuapetes Clarke, 1919
 Dactylonia Fransen, 2002
 Dasella Lebour, 1945
 Dasycaris Kemp, 1922
 Diapontonia Bruce, 1986
 Echinopericlimenes Marin & Chan, 2014
 Epipontonia Bruce, 1977
 Eupontonia Bruce, 1971
 Exoclimenella Bruce, 1995
 Exopontonia Bruce, 1988
 Fennera Holthuis, 1951
 Gnathophylleptum d’Udekem d’Acoz, 2001
 Gnathophylloides Schmitt, 1933
 Gnathophyllum Latreille, 1819
 Hamiger Borradaile, 1916
 Hamodactyloides Fujino, 1973
 Hamodactylus Holthuis, 1952
 Hamopontonia Bruce, 1970
 Harpiliopsis Borradaile, 1917
 Harpilius Dana, 1852
 Holthuisaeus Anker & De Grave, 2010
 Hymenocera Latreille, 1819
 Ischnopontonia Bruce, 1966
 Isopontonia Bruce, 1982
 Izucaris Okuno, 1999
 Jocaste Holthuis, 1952
 Kaviengella Šobánová & Duriš, 2018
 Laomenes Clarke, 1919
 Leander Desmarest, 1849
 Leandrites Holthuis, 1950
 Leptocarpus Holthuis, 1950
 Leptomenaeus Bruce, 2007
 Leptopalaemon Bruce & Short, 1993
 Levicaris Bruce, 1973
 Lipkebe Chace, 1969
 Lipkemenes Bruce & Okuno, 2010
 Macrobrachium Bate, 1868
 Madangella Frolova & Duris, 2018
 Manipontonia Bruce, Okuno & Li, 2005
 Margitonia Bruce, 2007
 Mesopontonia Bruce, 1967
 Metapontonia Bruce, 1967
 Michaelimenes Okuno, 2017
 Miopontonia Bruce, 1985
 Nematopalaemon Holthuis, 1950
 Neoanchistus Bruce, 1975
 Neoclimenes L.i.Mitsuhashi & Chan, 2010
 Neopalaemon H.H.Jr.Hobbs, 1973
 Neopericlimenes Heard, Spotte & Bubucis, 1993
 Neopontonides Holthuis, 1951
 Nippontonia Bruce & Bauer, 1997
 Notopontonia Bruce, 1991
 Odontonia Fransen, 2002
 Onycocaridella Bruce, 1981
 Onycocaridites Bruce, 1987
 Onycocaris Nobili, 1904
 Onycomenes Bruce, 2009
 Opaepupu Anker & DeGrave, 2021
 Orthopontonia Bruce, 1982
 Palaemon Weber, 1795
 Palaemonella Dana, 1852
 Palaemonetes Heller, 1869
 Paraclimenaeus Bruce, 1988
 Paraclimenes Bruce, 1995
 Paranchistus Holthuis, 1952
 Paratypton Balss, 1914
 Patonia Mitsuhashi & Chan, 2006
 Periclimenaeus Borradaile, 1915
 Periclimenella Bruce, 1995
 Periclimenes Costa, 1844
 Periclimenoides Bruce, 1990
 Philarius Holthuis, 1952
 Phycomenes Bruce, 2008
 Phyllognathia Borradaile, 1915
 Pinnotherotonia Marin & Paulay, 2010
 Platycaris Holthuis, 1952
 Platypontonia Bruce, 1968
 Plesiomenaeus Bruce, 2009
 Plesiopontonia Bruce, 1985
 Pliopontonia Bruce, 1973
 Pontonia Latreille, 1829
 Pontonides Borradaile, 1917
 Pontoniopsides Bruce, 2005
 Pontoniopsis Borradaile, 1915
 Poripontonia Fransen, 2003
 Propontonia Bruce, 1969
 Pseudoclimenes Bruce, 2008
 Pseudocoutierea Holthuis, 1951
 Pseudopalaemon Sollaud, 1911
 Pseudopontonia Bruce, 1992
 Pseudopontonides Heard, 1986
 Pseudoveleronia Marin, 2008
 Pycnocaris Bruce, 1972
 Rapimenes Duriš & Horká, 2017
 Rapipontonia Marin, 2007
 Rhopalaemon Ashelby & De Grave, 2010
 Rostronia Fransen, 2002
 Sandimenes Li, 2009
 Sandyella Marin, 2009
 Stegopontonia Nobili, 1906
 Tectopontonia Bruce, 1973
 Tenuipedium N.g.Wowor, 2010
 Thaumastocaris Kemp, 1922
 Troglindicus Sankolli & Shenoy, 1979
 Troglocubanus Holthuis, 1949
 Troglomexicanus Villalobos, Alvarez & Iliffe, 1999
 Tuleariocaris Hipeau-Jacquotte, 1965
 Typton Costa, 1844
 Typtonoides Bruce, 2010
 Typtonomenaeus Marin & Chan, 2013
 Typtonychus Bruce, 1996
 Unguicaris Marin & Chan, 2006
 Urocaridella Borradaile, 1915
 Urocaris Stimpson, 1860
 Veleronia Holthuis, 1951
 Veleroniopsis Gore, 1981
 Vir Holthuis, 1952
 Waldola Holthuis, 1951
 Yemenicaris Bruce, 1997
 Zenopontonia Bruce, 1975
 † Alburnia Bravi & Garassino, 1998
 † Bechleja Houša, 1957
 † Beurlenia Martins-Neto & Mezzalira, 1991
 † Kellnerius Santana, Pinheiro, Da Silva & Saraiva, 2013
 † Micropsalis von Meyer, 1859
 † Propalaemon Woodward, 1903
 † Pseudocaridinella Martins-Neto & Mezzalira, 1991
 † Schmelingia Schweigert, 2002
 † Yongjiacaris Garassino, Shen, Schram & Taylor, 2002

References

Palaemonidae